Elections to Lambeth London Borough Council were held in May 1971.  The whole council was up for election. Turnout was 35.4%. This election had aldermen as well as councillors. Labour and the Conservatives both got 5 aldermen.

Election result

|}

Ward results

Angell

Bishop's

Clapham Park

Clapham Town

Ferndale

Herne Hill

Knight's Hill

Larkhall

Leigham

Oval

Prince's

St Leonard's

Stockwell

Streatham South

Streatham Wells

Thornton

Thurlow Park

Town Hall

Tulse Hill

Vassall

References

1971
1971 London Borough council elections
20th century in the London Borough of Lambeth